Middletown Township is a township in Susquehanna County, Pennsylvania, United States. The population was 283 at the 2020 census.

Geography

Demographics

As of the census of 2010, there were 382 people, 151 households, and 107 families residing in the township.  The population density was 13.2 people per square mile (5.1/km2).  There were 275 housing units at an average density of 9.5/sq mi (3.7/km2).  The racial makeup of the township was 98.4% White, 0.5% Asian, 0.3% from Pacific Islander, and 0.8% from two or more races. Hispanic or Latino of any race were 1.6% of the population.

There were 151 households, out of which 28.5% had children under the age of 18 living with them, 57.6% were married couples living together, 4.6% had a female householder with no husband present, and 29.1% were non-families. 21.9% of all households were made up of individuals, and 12.6% had someone living alone who was 65 years of age or older.  The average household size was 2.53 and the average family size was 2.93.

In the township the population was spread out, with 20.7% under the age of 18, 62.3% from 18 to 64, and 17% who were 65 years of age or older.  The median age was 44 years.

The median income for a household in the township was $38,393, and the median income for a family was $42,917. Males had a median income of $31,513 versus $33,333 for females. The per capita income for the township was $19,810.  About 17.3% of families and 25.7% of the population were below the poverty line, including 58.4% of those under age 18 and 2.5% of those age 65 or over.

References

Populated places established in 1799
Townships in Susquehanna County, Pennsylvania
Townships in Pennsylvania